Stories of Hope and Fear is the fourth compilation album featuring radio broadcasts from This American Life.

Track listing
Hope
Jorge Just – If I Can Make It There – 7:10
Jonathan Goldstein and Starlee Kine – Is This Thing On? – 11:43
David Wilcox – Thinking Inside the Box – 9:34
Alex Blumberg and Griffin Hansbury – Infinite Gent – 14:42
Sascha Rothchild – Miami Vices – 7:49
Carol Bove and Myron Jones – The Babysitters – 25:23

Fear
Tom Wright – Fears of Your Life – 9:12
Julie Snyder – On Hold No One Can Hear You Scream: An Interview with Julie Snyder – 22:06
Nancy Updike – Anti-Oedipus – 20:57
David Sedaris – So a Chipmunk and a Squirrel Walk into a Bar – 7:52
John Hodgman – Slingshot – 9:22

See also
This American Life: Hand It Over -- Stories from Our First Year on the Air
Lies, Sissies, and Fiascoes: The Best of This American Life
Crimebusters + Crossed Wires: Stories from This American Life

External links
This American Life on-line store

Self-released albums
This American Life albums
2006 compilation albums